Mount Barlow is located on the Continental Divide along the border of Alberta and British Columbia at the southern edge of the Freshfield Icefield in Banff National Park. It was named in 1916 by D.B. Dowling after Dr. Alfred Ernest Barlow, a cartographer with the Geological Survey of Canada who perished in the 1914 Empress of Ireland disaster.

See also
List of peaks on the Alberta–British Columbia border
Mountains of Alberta
Mountains of British Columbia

References

Three-thousanders of Alberta
Three-thousanders of British Columbia
Canadian Rockies